Hakon Leffler (11 March 1887 – 31 July 1972) was a Swedish engineer, businessman and tennis player.

He was the son of merchant Carl Leopold Leffler, studied electrical engineering at the Royal Institute of Technology from 1905 to 1908, and at Uppsala University where he graduated in 1910. After having worked at the M.E. Delbanco company 1912–1915, he became the CEO of Svensk oljeslageri AB 1916. In 1929 he became the deputy CEO at Gamlestadens fabriker, a textile company in Gothenburg, and in 1935 its CEO.

Olympic career
Leffler competed in two individual tennis events at the 1912 Summer Olympics.

References

1887 births
1972 deaths
Swedish male tennis players
Olympic tennis players of Sweden
Tennis players at the 1912 Summer Olympics
Sportspeople from Gothenburg
20th-century Swedish businesspeople
KTH Royal Institute of Technology alumni
Uppsala University alumni